Richard Edlund,  (born December 6, 1940) is an American visual effects artist and inventor. He was a founding member of Industrial Light & Magic, having already founded Pignose amplifiers, and later co-founded Boss Film Studios and DuMonde VFX. He has won four Academy Awards for Best Visual Effects (1978, Star Wars; 1982, Raiders of the Lost Ark), as well as two Special Achievement Awards, two Scientific and Technical Awards, and the Medal of Commendation. He is also a BAFTA and Emmy Award recipient.

Life and career 
Edlund was born in Fargo, North Dakota and raised in Fergus Falls, Minnesota. After first joining the United States Navy, he developed an interest in experimental film and attended the USC School of Cinematic Arts in the late 1960s. On the strength of a couple of short films, he was picked by John Dykstra to work as first cameraman at the embryonic Industrial Light & Magic on the production on Star Wars for which he shared an Academy Award.

Edlund continued to work with Dykstra on Battlestar Galactica but was invited back by George Lucas to work on The Empire Strikes Back. Edlund's considerable technical challenge on this film was to optically composite miniatures against a white background resulting in a second Academy Award. Edlund also did distinguished work for Lucas and ILM on Raiders of the Lost Ark and Poltergeist.

In 1983, following the completion of Return of the Jedi, Edlund set up his own effects company, Boss Films, whose credits include Ghostbusters, Big Trouble in Little China, Die Hard, The Hunt for Red October, Cliffhanger, Outbreak and Air Force One. Boss Film Studios was one of the first traditional effects houses that successfully transitioned from "tangible world" visual effects, to computer generated imagery, with many notable CGI artists beginning their careers at Boss.

Aside from film-work, Edlund also developed and manufactured the Pignose portable-style guitar amplifier (co-designed by Wayne Kimball). He is a Governor of the Academy of Motion Picture Arts and Sciences, a founder of the Academy's visual effects branch and is chair of the Branch Executive Committee, also chairman of the Academy’s Science and Technology Council. He also serves as board member of the Visual Effects Society and on the board of directors of the American Society of Cinematographers.

Edlund was married to Rita Kogan, the only daughter of entrepreneur Michael Kogan, before her death in 2019.

Filmography

Film

Television

Awards and honors

References

Notes

External links
 

1940 births
Living people
People from Fargo, North Dakota
People from Fergus Falls, Minnesota
Best Visual Effects Academy Award winners
Best Visual Effects BAFTA Award winners
Special effects people
Special Achievement Academy Award winners
Emmy Award winners
Recipients of the John A. Bonner Medal of Commendation
USC School of Cinematic Arts alumni
United States Navy sailors
Industrial Light & Magic people